Adelina Covián (born Oviedo) is a Spanish painter whose brightly colored landscapes reflect a message of love and optimism. Her first exhibition took place in Madrid in 1964. Since then she has had solo exhibitions in San Sebastián, Barcelona, Torremolinos, Paris, and Gijón, and has contributed to collective exhibitions in Spain and abroad.

References

Living people
Year of birth missing (living people)
20th-century Spanish painters
20th-century Spanish women artists
21st-century Spanish women artists
Spanish women painters
People from Oviedo
Spanish landscape painters